Aslina An Ping Chua (born 26 January 1996) is a Malaysian former tennis player.

Chua made her WTA Tour debut at the 2013 Malaysian Open, having received a wildcard into the main draw of the singles competition. She lost in the first round to Zhang Shuai, 0–6, 1–6. Chua also received a wildcard into the doubles event, partnering Yang Zi. However, they lost to the fourth seeds, Rika Fujiwara and Zheng Saisai in the first round, 5–7, 6–3, [4–10].

Playing for Malaysia at the Fed Cup, Chua has a win–loss record of 5–6.

References

External links
 
 
 
 

1996 births
Living people
Malaysian female tennis players
Malaysian people of Chinese descent
People from Kuching
Michigan State Spartans women's tennis players